The British National Keirin Championships are held annually as part of the British National Track Championships organised by British Cycling. The men's championship was inaugurated in 1983  and a women's championship was held for the first time in 2003.

Men's Senior Race

+ winner following disqualification of Shawn Lynch

Women's Senior Race

Men's Junior Race

References

Cycle racing in the United Kingdom
National track cycling championships
National championships in the United Kingdom
Annual sporting events in the United Kingdom